The New Zealand Music Hall of Fame | Te Whare Taonga Puoro o Aotearoa is a figurative hall of fame dedicated to noteworthy New Zealand musicians.

The hall was created in 2007 by Recorded Music NZ (then known as the Recording Industry Association of New Zealand (RIANZ)) and the Australasian Performing Right Association (APRA). Two inductions are made into the hall each year, one at the APRA Silver Scroll Awards, decided by APRA, and the other is awarded as part of the Aotearoa Music Awards, chosen by Recorded Music NZ. 

The Exponents frontman Jordan Luck has been inducted twice, first as the inaugural inductee at the 2007 APRA Silver Scroll Awards and again with his band The Exponents at the 2015 New Zealand Music Awards.

Eligibility 
To be eligible for induction into the Hall of Fame, the artist must have released a work or achieve another significant professional milestone at least 20 years prior. They must also have shown musical excellence in their career. Also considered is the significance and influence and the impact of the artist's work on New Zealand music.

Award 

Both the APRA and the Recorded Music NZ inductees receive a framed certificate to mark their induction as well as the Hall of Fame "soundshell", created by sculptor Jim Wheeler. The Recorded Music NZ inductees also receive the Legacy Award which is represented as a platinum Tui trophy.

Controversy 

Salmonella Dub allegedly turned down the opportunity to be the 2017 Legacy Award winner and Hall of Fame inductee at the 2017 New Zealand Music Awards. The band requested that Wellington post-punk band Beat Rhythm Fashion perform as part of the induction ceremony, however, it was claimed that the award organisers turned down the request, saying that Beat Rhythm Fashion was "too obscure" for the broad television audience of the music awards. Salmonella Dub then turned down the Hall of Fame entry. However, there was no confirmation of this from the Hall of Fame organisers nor independent sources.

Indie rock band The Clean have twice turned down the opportunity to be inducted into the Hall of Fame. Band member Robert Scott explained, "We feel we are outside the industry, and in the past we were shunned and dismissed and it seems like by saying yes we would be forgiving the industry for that." The group have since been inducted into the hall.

List of inducted artists
Groups have their members listed below the group name.

References

External links
 New Zealand Music Hall of Fame at APRA-AMCOS
 Jordan Luck's presentation at the 2007 APRA Silver Scroll Awards
 Performance of Hirirani Melbourne's music at the 2009 APRA Silver Scroll Awards
 Performance of The Fourmyula's music at the 2010 APRA Silver Scroll Awards
 Hello Sailor's presentation at the 2011 APRA Silver Scroll Awards
 Herbs' presentation at the 2012 APRA Silver Scroll Awards

Awards established in 2007
Music halls of fame
Hall of Fame
Music
2007 establishments in New Zealand